John Matthew Adams (born July 27, 1946) is a Canadian former professional ice hockey goaltender who played 22 games in the National Hockey League for the Boston Bruins and Washington Capitals between 1972 and 1975. He was born in Port Arthur, Ontario.

Playing career 
After enjoying great success in the junior ranks with his hometown Port Arthur team - he is one of the only players to appear in four consecutive Memorial Cup tournaments - he signed with the Boston Bruins of the National Hockey League. Assigned to the minor league Dayton Gems of the International Hockey League in 1967, Adams played two seasons with the Gems, winning the leading goaltending award in 1969. In the fall of 1969, he was assigned to the Bruins' leading farm team at the time, the Oklahoma City Blazers of the Central Hockey League, for whom he played for the next two seasons, winning honors as a league first-team all-star in 1972.

During the 1970 playoffs, Adams was recalled to the Bruins as a reserve to back up regular goaltenders Gerry Cheevers and Ed Johnston. He did not play a game, yet the Bruins decided to engrave his name on the Stanley Cup upon winning the championship, making him one of the few players to have his name on the Stanley Cup before playing a NHL game.

Adams would not play his first NHL game for another three seasons. In 1972–73, with Cheevers gone to the World Hockey Association and disruption in the Boston net, he played fourteen games for the defending champion Bruins while splitting his time with the new Bruins' affiliate Boston Braves of the American Hockey League.

Traded to the minor-league San Diego Gulls of the Western Hockey League the following year, Adams won second-team all-star honors before being sold to the Washington Capitals in 1974. He played only eight games with the Capitals, again splitting the season between the NHL and the minor leagues.

Adams was named a player-coach for the Thunder Bay Twins of the Ontario Senior League the following year, before retiring as a player five seasons later, settling in the Thunder Bay area in retirement. His final position in professional hockey was as an assistant coach for the Thunder Bay Thunder Hawks of the Colonial Hockey League in 1991.

Career statistics

Regular season and playoffs

External links 

1946 births
Living people
Boston Braves (AHL) players
Boston Bruins players
Canadian expatriate ice hockey players in the United States
Canadian ice hockey goaltenders
Dayton Gems players
Ice hockey people from Ontario
Oklahoma City Blazers (1965–1977) players
Ontario Hockey Association Senior A League (1890–1979) players
Richmond Robins players
San Diego Gulls (WHL) players
Sportspeople from Thunder Bay
Washington Capitals players